The Chris Tompkins House is a historic house at 144 South Oak Drive in Burdette, Arkansas.  It is a single story wood-frame structure, with a broadly overhanging hip roof and dormer.  A porch with wrought iron railing extends across the front of the house, and a carport, added in 1938, is on the north side.  The house was built in 1903 by the Three States Lumber Company, a major lumber operator in the early decades of the 20th century in Mississippi County, as a residence for mid-level managers.  Burdette was essentially a company town at the time, and this is one of two houses from the period to survive.

The house was listed on the National Register of Historic Places in 2001.

See also
National Register of Historic Places listings in Mississippi County, Arkansas

References

Houses on the National Register of Historic Places in Arkansas
Houses completed in 1903
Houses in Mississippi County, Arkansas
National Register of Historic Places in Mississippi County, Arkansas
1903 establishments in Arkansas
Company housing
Bungalow architecture in Arkansas
American Craftsman architecture in Arkansas